Qiongzhou Bridge, also known as the Nandu Bridge and the Nandu Ninth Bridge, is a bridge that spans the Nandu River, Hainan Province, China. Opened on May 12, 2003, at a cost of 200 million yuan (US$32.3 million), it serves as the main bridge from Haikou city to Haikou Meilan International Airport. It crosses the Nandu River at the east end of Guoxing Avenue.

Description

This is a tied-arch bridge comprising five tubular steel arches mounted on six concrete foundations. It is a two-way bridge with each direction having two lanes for cars and trucks. These two lanes are separated from the main traffic roads by a concrete barrier and the points where the arches enter the deck.

References

Road bridges in China
Bridges in Hainan
Transport in Hainan
Bridges completed in 2003
2003 establishments in China